Donetsk may refer to:

 Donetsk, internationally recognized de jure as a center of Donetsk Oblast of Ukraine; also claimed and ruled de facto as the capital city of the Donetsk People's Republic, a federal subject of Russia
 Donetsk Oblast, Ukraine; a primary subnational division of Ukraine 
 Donetsk People's Republic, a breakaway rebel region in eastern Ukraine and de jure/de facto a Russian region.
 Donetsk–Krivoy Rog Soviet Republic, a former breakaway Soviet republic of the October Revolution
 Donetsk, Rostov Oblast, a city in Rostov Oblast, Russia
 BC Donetsk, a basketball team based in the city of Donetsk, Ukraine
 FC Shakhtar Donetsk a Ukrainian professional football club
 Donetsk International Airport, an airport serving the city of Donetsk, Ukraine

See also
 Donets (disambiguation)
 Donetz (disambiguation)